The 1999 NCAA Division I softball season, play of college softball in the United States organized by the National Collegiate Athletic Association (NCAA) at the Division I level, began in February 1999.  The season progressed through the regular season, many conference tournaments and championship series, and concluded with the 1999 NCAA Division I softball tournament and 1999 Women's College World Series.  The Women's College World Series, consisting of the eight remaining teams in the NCAA Tournament and held in Oklahoma City at ASA Hall of Fame Stadium, ended on May 31, 1999.

Conference standings

Women's College World Series
The 1999 NCAA Women's College World Series took place from May 27 to May 31, 1999 in Oklahoma City.

Season leaders
Batting
Batting average: .541 – Amanda Michalsky, UTSA Roadrunners
RBIs: 91 – Stacey Nuveman, UCLA Bruins
Home runs: 31 – Stacey Nuveman, UCLA Bruins

Pitching
Wins: 43-6 – Courtney Blades, Southern Miss Golden Eagles
ERA: 0.24 (8 ER/235.2 IP) – Amanda Scott, Fresno State Bulldogs
Strikeouts: 497 – Courtney Blades, Southern Miss Golden Eagles

Records
NCAA Division I season consecutive scoreless innings streak:
105.0 – Danielle Henderson, UMass Minutewomen; March 16-May 2, 1999

NCAA Division I single game hits:
8 – Carrie Moreman, Alabama Crimson Tide; March 21, 1999

Freshman class at bats:
259 – Jennifer Tiffany, UIC Flames

Sophomore class home runs:
31 – Stacey Nuveman, UCLA Bruins

Awards
Honda Sports Award Softball:
Danielle Henderson, UMass Minutewomen

All America Teams
The following players were members of the All-American Teams.

First Team

Second Team

Third Team

References